Maranjau is a settlement in Murang'a County of Kenya's Central Province. As of 2019 it had a population of 2,209 across 612 households.

References 

Populated places in Central Province (Kenya)